The Chinese Manichaean hymn scroll is a scroll found by British archaeologist Aurel Stein in the Mogao Grottoes. It contains a series of hymns used in religious ceremonies. It is currently in the collection of the British Library, number S.2659。

Introduction 
The first volume of the manuscript is slightly incomplete, and the content is written in the form of poetry. Among them, there are 1254 sentences of seven-character poems, and a few four-character and five-character poems. According to Lin Wushu's research, these hymns were translated from a Middle Iranian language, rather than original by the Manicheans. Many of the contents are dedicated to the Jesus of Manichaeism-Yishu, and the hymn to the highest deity of Manichaeism.

In the 'Praise Jesus' text 
After Manichaeism was introduced into China, because the image of Jesus was quite unfamiliar to Chinese culture, missionaries combined it with Buddhist imagery, called Jesus Buddha, and made him a model of great mercy and relief. Therefore, believers wrote in the following excerpt from the hymn "Praise Jesus Text", which is like a Buddhist scripture in the Chinese Manichaean hymn scroll.

See also 
 Chinese Manichaeism
 Manichaean Compendium
 Fragmented pages of Manichaen manuscripts

References

External links 

Chinese Manichaeism
Manichaean texts